More Guitar Stories is a studio album by guitarist Jim West. The album earned West a Grammy Award for Best New Age Album.

References

Grammy Award for Best New Age Album